Yasnaya Polyana is a rural locality (a village) in Tonshalovskoye Rural Settlement, Cherepovetsky District, Vologda Oblast, Russia. The population was 760 as of 2002. There are 4 streets.

Geography 
Yasnaya Polyana is located 5 km north of Cherepovets (the district's administrative centre) by road. Cherepovets is the nearest rural locality.

References 

Rural localities in Cherepovetsky District